Khanzharovo (Xänyär) is a rural locality (a village) in Aksyonovsky Selsoviet, Alsheyevsky District, Bashkortostan, Russia. The population was 226 as of 2010. There are 3 streets.

Geography 
Khanzharovo is located 31 km southwest of Rayevsky (the district's administrative centre) by road. Bikchagul is the nearest rural locality.

References 

Rural localities in Alsheyevsky District